Cambridge Investment Research Incorporation is a United States-based broker-dealer and asset management firm headquartered in Fairfield, Iowa.  The company was founded in 1981 and mainly works as a broker-dealer, but also manages investment assets through its subsidiary Cambridge Investment Research Advisors Inc.

It is one of the largest independent broker-dealers in the United States.

History
Cambridge Investment Research was founded in 1985 by Eric Schwartz.  As of 2010 it was still controlled by its founder, and was one of the biggest broker/dealers in the US.

In January 2017, Schwartz stepped out of the CEO role and was made Executive Chairman, and Amy Webber was made CEO in addition to her role as president.

As of 2017, the company was structured as a holding company, Cambridge Investment Group, Inc., that comprised multiple broker-dealers and registered investment adviser subsidiaries, including: Cambridge Investment Research Advisors, Inc. and Cambridge Investment Research, Inc.

In April 2016, the U.S. Securities and Exchange Commission charged Cambridge Investment Research Advisors with failing to adequately supervise an employee who defrauded at least 47 advisory clients and engaged in unsuitable trading in some clients’ accounts. The company settled the case by paying a $225,000 penalty.

Webber joined the FINRA Board of Governors in August 2017.

Investments
The company's top 5 holdings as of March 2017 were:

References

1981 establishments in Iowa
Brokerage firms
Companies based in Iowa
Investment management companies of the United States